Sheikha Bodour bint Sultan Al Qasimi (born 1978) is the Chairperson of the Board of Trustees and President of the American University of Sharjah, Chairperson and President of Sharjah Research, Technology and Innovation Park (SRTIP), Chairperson of the Sharjah Investment and Development Authority, Chairperson of Sharjah Entrepreneurship Center (Sheraa), Founder and Chief Executive Officer of children's publisher Kalimat Group, Founder and Chairperson of Kalimat Foundation, Founder of the Emirates Publishers Association, Founder of the UAE Board on Books for Young People, President of the American University of Sharjah, and past President of the International Publishers Association. Her father is His Highness Dr. Sheikh Sultan bin Muhammad Al-Qasimi, who has served as Ruler of the Emirate of Sharjah since 1972.

Career and awards 
Al Qasimi leads several Sharjah, United Arab Emirates (UAE), regional, and global institutions and initiatives to foster socio-economic development, support cultural industries and heritage, and catalyse multi-stakeholder partnerships for sustainable development. Her career spans public service, business, and community organisations.

In January 2023, Al Qasimi was appointed Chairperson of the Board of Trustees and President of the American University of Sharjah to align the institution with Sharjah’s socio-economic, workforce, and innovation priorities. The appointment came after His Highness Dr. Sheikh Sultan bin Muhammad Al Qasimi, who held the role for 25 years, stepped down to welcome a new generation of university leadership. 

Al Qasimi heads Sharjah’s efforts to attract investment, create a world-class entrepreneurship ecosystem, and promote R&D. As Chairperson of the Sharjah Investment and Development Authority, she is solidifying the Emirate’s strengths in manufacturing, transport, logistics, education, and the cultural economy. She is also leading flagship initiatives to attract investment in strategic growth sectors like tourism, healthcare, environmental technology, agritech, and the digital economy. Her work as Chairperson of Sharjah Entrepreneurship Center (Sheraa) is accelerating the development of Sharjah’s entrepreneurship ecosystem and has supported 150 startups that have raised $128 million in investment and created 1,400 jobs. She is also Chairperson and President of Sharjah Research, Technology and Innovation Park (SRTIP), a $150 million initiative to commercialize academic research and promote R&D, attracting more than 2,000 companies to Sharjah which have in turn invested more than $100 million in research on transportation, agriculture, renewable energy, 3D printing, augmented and virtual reality.

Al Qasimi founded Kalimat Publishing Group in 2007, and she has led its growth into a global, multi-imprint publishing and educational technology company with distribution in more than 15 countries. The publisher of over 500 titles, Kalimat is recognised as an industry pioneer for themes highlighting traditional Arabic culture alongside the modern challenges faced by children. It is also known for its Arabic translations of books which deal with subjects that occasionally push sociocultural boundaries. Kalimat has international partnerships with prominent international publishers, such as Éditions Gallimard Jeunesse and Quarto, and it has received several international awards including in 2016 the Bologna Children’s Book Fair Best Children’s Publisher of the Year award.

Kalimat Foundation, a corporate social responsibility initiative of Kalimat Publishing Group, is involved in promoting literacy, reading culture, and book accessibility. The Foundation supports children who are victims of war and displacement, and who are visually disabled. As of May 2021, the Foundation’s Pledge a Library initiative had donated books and delivered literacy programs globally in 17 countries. The Foundation’s Ara initiative is establishing accessible (braille, audio, e-text, large print) book standards for the visually impaired and blind in the Middle East and North Africa and supporting publishers to increase the number of accessible books for people with print disabilities. Ara also played a key role in UAE’s accession to the Marrakesh Treaty which promulgates international copyright exceptions, resulting in its becoming in October 2022 the first non-profit organisation in the country to be granted an accessible publishing license. Ara was shortlisted by the Accessible Books Consortium in its International Excellence Award for Accessible Publishing in February 2020 and November 2022.

In recognition of Sharjah’s emergence as a global cultural hub, Al Qasimi chaired the committee that earned Sharjah the designation of UNESCO World Book Capital for 2019. A significant legacy initiative of Sharjah World Book Capital 2019 is the iconic House of Wisdom, a state-of-the art showcase library and cultural centre. Sharjah World Book Capital also provided a grant for the restoration of Kenya’s historical colonial-era McMillan Memorial Library, one of Africa’s most iconic institutions, and the Eastlands Library in Makadara, both of which are in Nairobi.

Al Qasimi founded the Emirates Publishers Association (EPA) in 2009 which became a full International Publishers Association (IPA) member in 2012. As EPA's Founder, she played a key role in national efforts to transform the publishing industry, which is valued at €250 million, and advocated for sensible industry regulations such as exempting books from valued added tax. EPA has also played a key role in engaging decision makers publicly and privately on freedom to publish. Al Qasimi was also the Founding president of the United Arab Emirates chapter of the International Board on Books for Young People (IBBY), which promotes literacy and administered the Sharjah IBBY Children in Crisis Fund. 

Al Qasimi is an advocate for developing publishing markets and global publishing industry issues such as literacy, freedom to publish, copyright, digital transformation, and diversity and inclusion. She has called for redefining the principle of freedom to publish in the Arab World and globally in several international conferences and forums such as the Arab Publishers Conference in the United Arab Emirates and Tunisia. She has also led freedom to publish fact finding missions to countries like Saudi Arabia, Egypt, and Mauritania to lobby for publishers in peril and press for progress.

To support publishers, authors, and content creators in having their work recognised and protected, Al Qasimi led discussions with the Ministry of Economy, Emirates Writers Union, and the Emirates Intellectual Property Association on the need to establish a reproduction rights organisation and enhance copyright enforcement in the United Arab Emirates. Due partially to her efforts, the Emirates Reprographic Rights Management Association (ERRA) was launched in March 2022. ERRA is accredited as an ad hoc non-governmental organisation observer to the World Intellectual Property Organization’s Standing Committee on Copyright and Related Rights.

After serving as Vice President from 2019 to 2020, Al Qasimi was elected to serve as President of the International Publishers Association (IPA) from 2021 to 2022. She is the second woman to serve as IPA’s President since it was founded in 1896 and the first Arab woman to hold the position. Her experience encountering global publishing’s longstanding diversity and inclusion challenge in running for IPA leadership motivated her to start PublisHer, a global network of women publishers committed to addressing industry diversity and inclusion. As IPA Vice President, she formed a partnership between Dubai Cares, a UAE-based global philanthropic organisation, and the African Publishing Innovation Fund, to award $800,000 in grants to fund African literacy, reading promotion, and library development initiatives. The Fund received global attention for its financial support toward the restoration of the Kaloleni Library in Nairobi. In response to the impact of the global pandemic on publishing, Al Qasimi led the IPA’s industry recovery support efforts under the International Sustainable Publishing and Industry Resilience (InSPIRe) initiative. The InSPIRe initiative involved consultations with over 150 senior publishing industry executives from across the industry value chain – including publishing houses, distributors, authors, educators, book fairs, and literacy and free-expression advocates – to support industry recovery and led to the establishment of the International Publishers Association Academy.

Al Qasimi is taking action on the world’s most pressing challenges through her involvement in international organisations. She is a key contributor to UNESCO’s World Book Capital Cities Network, a collective of member cities committed to literacy, reading, international exchange, and lifelong learning as cornerstones to inclusive, sustainable societies. Al Qasimi was the first Emirati woman to co-chair the World Economic Forum on the Middle East and North Africa and the first woman to chair the World Economic Forum‘s Regional Business Council for the Middle East and North Africa. She has leveraged the World Economic Forum’s global platform to catalyse action on youth education and employment, female entrepreneurship, small and medium-size enterprise development, expanding funding for the cultural industries, and climate change.

Education 
Bodour Al Qasimi holds a BA (Hons) degree from University of Cambridge, and an MSc in Medical Anthropology from the University College London (UCL).

Personal life

Bodour Al Qasimi is married to Sheikh Sultan bin Ahmed Al Qasimi, who is also a member of Sharjah's ruling family and was appointed in August 2021 as Deputy Ruler of Sharjah.

References

External links
 Forbes Profile

1978 births
Living people
People from the Emirate of Sharjah
Emirati autobiographers
Bodour bint Sultan
Alumni of the University of Cambridge
Alumni of University College London
Daughters of monarchs